Vincamine is a monoterpenoid indole alkaloid found in the leaves of Vinca minor (lesser periwinkle), comprising about 25-65% of its indole alkaloids by weight.  It can also be synthesized from related alkaloids.

Uses
Vincamine is sold in Europe as a prescription medicine for the treatment of primary degenerative and vascular dementia.  In the United States, it is permitted to be sold as a dietary supplement when labeled for use in adults for six months or less. Most common preparations are in the sustained release tablet forms.

Chemistry

Synthesis
Tabersonine can be used for semi-synthesis of vincamine.

Derivatives
Vinpocetine is a synthetic derivative of vincamine used for cerebrovascular diseases and as dietary supplement. Vincamine derivatives have been also studied as anti addictive and antidiabetic agents.

Research
It may have nootropic effects. It has been investigated as novel anticancer drug.

See also 
Apparicine
Conophylline

References

External links
 
 

Tertiary alcohols
Tryptamine alkaloids
Methyl esters
Quinolizidine alkaloids
Vinca alkaloids
Heterocyclic compounds with 5 rings